"The White Dwarf" is the twenty-first episode of the second series of the 1960s cult British spy-fi television series The Avengers, starring Patrick Macnee and Honor Blackman. It was first broadcast in the Teledu Cymru region of the ITV network on Friday 15 February 1963. ABC Weekend TV, who produced the show for ITV, broadcast it the next day in its own regions. The episode was directed by Richmond Harding and written by Malcolm Hulke.

Plot
A leading astronomer predicts that the earth is about to be destroyed. Steed and Cathy investigate a conspiracy to silence him.

Cast
 Patrick Macnee as John Steed
 Honor Blackman as Cathy Gale
 George A. Cooper as Maxwell Barker
 Philip Latham as Professor Cartwright
 Peter Copley as Henry Barker
 Bill Nagy as Mervin Johnson
 Daniel Thorndike as Sir Charles
 Constance Chapman as Miss Edwina Tregarth
 Keith Pyott as Professor Richter
 Paul Anil as Professor Rahim
 John Falconer as Butler
 Vivienne Drummond as Dr Elizabeth Fuller
 George Roubicek as Dr Luke Richter

References

External links

Episode overview on The Avengers Forever! website

The Avengers (season 2) episodes
1963 British television episodes